Lehtovaara is a Finnish surname. Notable people with the surname include:

Jukka Lehtovaara (born 1988), Finnish football goalkeeper
Urho Lehtovaara (1917–1949), Finnish military pilot

See also
Lehtovaara PIK-16 Vasama, a Finnish single-seat plane

Finnish-language surnames